William Matthew Land (April 10, 1880 – death unknown) was an American Negro league outfielder in the 1900s and 1910s. 

A native of Buckhorn, Virginia, Land made his Negro leagues debut in 1906 with the New York Colored Giants. Land then played with the Brooklyn Royal Giants and Cuban Giants in 1908. He played for both clubs again the following season, and played again for the Cuban Giants in 1911 and 1913.

References

External links
  and Seamheads

1880 births
Place of death missing
Year of death missing
Brooklyn Royal Giants players
Cuban Giants players
Habana players
Schenectady Mohawk Giants players
Baseball outfielders
Baseball players from Virginia
American expatriate baseball players in Cuba